Antonio Garbiglietti (30 November 1807, Biella – 24 January 1887, Turin) was an Italian entomologist who specialised in Heteroptera . He wrote (1869). Catalogus methodicus et synonymicus et hemipterorum eteropterorum (Rhyngotha Fabr.) Italiae indigenarum. Accedit descriptio aliquot specierum vel minus vel nondum cognitarum. Bull. Soc. Entomol. Ital. 1: 41-52, 105-124, 181-198, 271-281.

Garbiglietti was a physician.
His collection is held by the Dipartimento Biologia Animale, Università di Torino-Turin Museum of Natural History.

References
Schuh R. T., and Slater J. A. True bugs of the world (Hemiptera: Heteroptera). Classification and natural history. 1995. Cornell University Press Ithaca.

Italian entomologists
1807 births
1887 deaths